Avantasia is the debut single by German supergroup rock opera project Avantasia. It's a re-recorded version of Avantasia's original demo EP.

Track listing
 "Avantasia" - 05:30
 "Reach Out for the Light" - 06:34
 "Final Sacrifice" - 05:03
 "Avantasia" (Edit Version) - 04:10

Demo track listing
 "Avantasia (demo)"
 "Reach Out for the Light (demo)"
 "Final Sacrifice (demo)"

Personnel
 Tobias Sammet (Edguy) - Lead vocals, keyboards
 Henjo Richter (Gamma Ray) - Guitars
 Markus Grosskopf (Helloween) - Bass
 Alex Holzwarth (Rhapsody of Fire) - Drums
 Michael Kiske (Helloween, Unisonic) - Additional lead vocals on tracks 1, 2, 4
 David DeFeis (Virgin Steele) - Additional lead vocals on track 3

References

Avantasia songs
2001 singles
2000 songs

pl:Avantasia (singel)